This is a list in alphabetical order of cricketers who have played first-class cricket for the Cambridge University Centre of Cricketing Excellence (UCCE) and Cambridge Marylebone Cricket Club University (MCCU). Players who have played first-class cricket for Cambridge University can be found in List of Cambridge University Cricket Club players.

The Cambridge UCCE was formed in 2001 by Cambridge University Cricket Club and Anglia Polytechnic University, now Anglia Ruskin University (ARU), with funding and support from Cambridge University and the England & Wales Cricket Board (ECB).  It continued until the 2009 season, when the Marylebone Cricket Club (MCC) took over funding from ECB, at which point it was renamed the MCCU.  It then also received  some support from ARU.

These teams include students from Anglia Ruskin University, as well as Cambridge University, and play in three-day first-class matches as well as in the UCCE/MCCU Championship, the British Universities & Colleges Sport National League one day competition and, in recent years, an inter-MCCU T20 competition.

No matches were played in the 2020 season due to the restrictions put in place during the Coronavirus outbreak.  In 2021, coinciding with the end of funding from MCC and any support from ARU, the team reverted to the UCCE title, as did the other MCCUs.  However, unlike the other UCCEs, Cambridge played as a single institution, selecting players only from Cambridge University.  With Coronavirus restrictions still in place, they competed against Durham UCCE, Loughborough UCCE and Leeds Bradford UCCE in the National league (North).

The details are the player's usual name followed by the years in which he was active as a player and then his name is given as it would appear on match scorecards. Current players are shown as active to the end of the current or most recent season.

A

B

C

D
 Graham Dill (2001) : G.J. Dill

E
 Philip Edwards (2004–2005) : P.D. Edwards
 Tom Elliott (2012–2014) : T. C. Elliott
 Harry Ellison (2014–2016) : H.R.C. Ellison
 Connor Emerton (2016) : C.J. Emerton

F
 Matthew Friedlander (2005–2008) : M.J. Friedlander

G
 Chris Grammer (2009) : C.M. Grammer
 Stephen Gray (2008–2010) : S.K. Gray
 Akil Greenidge (2017–2019) : A.D. Greenidge
 Callum Guest (2017–2019) : C.J. Guest
 Amit Gupta (2011) : A. Gupta

H

J
 Gareth James (2004–2007) : G.D. James
 Kunal Jogia (2006–2008) : J.A. Jogia
 Adam Johnson (2001) : A.H.V. Johnson
 James Johnson (2012–2014) : J.A.M. Johnson
 John Jordison (2002) : J.R. Jordison
 Andrew Joslin (2009–2010) : A.J.P. Joslin

K
 Matthew Kay (2004) : M.A. Kay
 Jack Keeping (2018–2019) : J.B.R. Keeping
 Robin Kemp (2007) : R.A. Kemp
 Vikram Kumar (2001–2003) : V.H. Kumar

L
 Nick Lee (2004–2010) : N.T. Lee
 Jivan Lotay (2009) : J.D.S. Lotay

M

N
 Grant Nicholson (2013) : G.F. Nicholson
 David Noble (2002) : D.J. Noble

O
 Liam O'Driscoll (2007–2008) : W.J.F. O'Driscoll
 Freddie Owen (2008) : F.G. Owen

P

R
 Sam Rippington (2017–2019) : S.E. Rippington
 Will Rist (2007–2008) : W.H. Rist
 Marc Rosenberg (2009) : M.C. Rosenberg

S

T
 Banutheeban Tavarasa (2007) : B. Tavarasa
 Michael Taylor (2010) : M.H. Taylor
 Joseph Tetley (2015–2017) : J.W. Tetley
 Patrick Tice (2017) : P.J.A. Tice
 Richard Timms (2005–2008) : R.T. Timms
 Peter Turnbull (2009–2012) : P.T. Turnbull

W

Y
 Chad Yates (2014) : C.S.J. Yates

Z
 Misem Zaidi (2017) : M.S. Zaidi
 Zain Shahzad (2014–2015) : Z. Shahzad

References

External links 
 www.cucc.net

Cambridge UCCE and MCCU
Sport at the University of Cambridge
Student cricket in the United Kingdom